The Thangmi (in Nepali थामी) are an indigenous tribe of the hills east of the Nepalese capital Kathmandu. They mainly live in Suspa, Kshamawati, Khopachagu, Alampu, Bigu, Kalinchok, Lapilang and Lakuri Danda villages of Dolakha district in East-Central Nepal. They are locally known as Thangmi.

The social structure of the Thami comprise a bilineal clan system. Apart from the male clans, there are distinct female lineages that are passed down from mother to daughter.

They speak the Thami language, which is related to Nepal Bhasha. They do not have a written script; however, inscriptions on monuments built over graves lay claim to one.

According to the 2011 Nepal Census, there are a total of 29,000 Thami of which some belong to the Kirant religion and some belong to Buddhism. Legend says that the first Thami couple had seven sons and seven daughters. When the parents could not find suitable marriage partners for their children, they allowed them to intermarry. The Thami people are their descendants.

The Thami men originally engaged in shifting agriculture besides hunting and foraging. They now earn a meagre living through the stone quarrying business and by joining the military forces. To escape this extreme hardship, many have fled to India to find better jobs. Many upper class members of Thami clan are living in Bhutan. They go to Nepal in search of employment, and to do business.
 
The Thami are shamanists, though they have come under strong Buddhist influence from the Tamang. Hindu influence can be also seen in their marriage rituals, which is a festival to them. Although they are poor they must make a chautara in the name of their deceased relatives. Recently many people of the Thami clan are joining Christianity.

References

 Remembering the Thami: A case study
Nepal Federation of Indigenous Nationalities
थामी जातिबारे जानौं: सपना थामी

Indigenous peoples of Nepal